The 2014–15 Russian Bandy Super League was the 23rd season of the present highest Russian men's bandy top division, Russian Bandy Super League. The regular season began on 8 November 2014, and the final was played in Khabarovsk on 21 March 2015.

Teams

League table

Knock-out stage

Bandy
Bandy
Russian Bandy Super League
Russian Bandy Super League
Seasons in Russian bandy